Dynamic Microprocessor Associates, Inc. (DMA), was a software company in the United States. Though best known for its remote administration product pcAnywhere, DMA also developed and marketed the relational database management system Formula IV, the BBS software Chairman and the modem control software ASCOM. It was acquired by Symantec on August 21, 1991, for US$22 million.

References

Defunct software companies of the United States
Gen Digital acquisitions